"Carry You Home" is a song by Swedish singer Zara Larsson from her debut studio album, 1. The single reached a peak of number three in Sweden and was certified 2× Platinum there.

Music video
The music video was released on 13 May 2014.

Track listing

Charts

Weekly charts
"Carry You Home" debuted at number five, reaching its peak of number three, four weeks later. It remained in the top 50 for 22 weeks.

Year-end charts

Certifications

Release history

References

2013 songs
2014 singles
Zara Larsson songs
Songs written by Elof Loelv
Song recordings produced by Elof Loelv